King Kennard Holmes (born September 1, 1937 in Ramsey County, Minnesota) is an American physician, microbiologist, epidemiologist, and medical school professor. He is an internationally recognized expert on sexually transmitted diseases, especially HIV/AIDS.

Education and career
Holmes graduated in 1955 from White Bear Senior High in White Bear Township, Ramsey County, Minnesota and in 1959 with a bachelor's degree from Harvard College (the undergraduate college of Harvard University). He received in 1963 his M.D. from Cornell University Medical College (now named Weill Cornell Medicine) and in 1967 his Ph.D. in microbiology from the University of Hawaii. Since 1969 he has been a faculty member at the University of Washington, where in 2006 he was appointed to the William H. Foege Chair of Global Health. He is the author or co-author of over 550 articles.

In 2013 Holmes received both the Canada Gairdner Global Health Award and the IDSA's Alexander Fleming Award for lifetime achievement.

References

1937 births
Living people
American epidemiologists
American infectious disease physicians
American medical researchers
Harvard College alumni
HIV/AIDS researchers
Physician-scientists
University of Hawaiʻi at Mānoa alumni
University of Washington faculty
Weill Cornell Medical College alumni
Members of the National Academy of Medicine